CINEMANIA Film Festival is a French-language film festival with English subtitles that takes place in Montreal. It is the most important event fully dedicated to francophone cinema in North-America.

Festival
The CINEMANIA French Film Festival in Montreal was established in 1995 and has continued annually ever since. The festival is dedicated solely to quality French-language feature films emanating from France, Belgium, Switzerland, Quebec, Algeria, Morocco, Senegal, and other French-speaking regions. All films screened must be North American, Canadian, or Quebec premieres, and all are subtitled in English. The event takes place every November during a period of 11 days opening on the first Thursday of the month. All films are screened in the Cinéma Impérial, Théâtre Outremont, Cinéma du Parc, Cinéma du Musée and Cinémathèque québécoise in downtown Montreal.

History 

The festival was founded by Maidy Teitelbaum who was the ongoing president until january 2020 when she definitively left the organization after 26 years of commitment. The festival's first 10 years were at the Montreal Museum of Fine Arts, but in 2004 the event moved to the greater capacity Imperial Cinema. In 2006, Teitelbaum was awarded the Chevalier dans l'ordre des Arts et des Lettres by the French government for her work in fostering French culture. In addition, in 2008 the SACD decorated Teitelbaum with the Médaille Beaumarchais awarded each year since 1 777 to the persons who best exemplify efforts to protect the rights of artists, composers and writers. In 2017, Maidy was awarded the distinction of Officier de l'Ordre des Arts et des Lettres de la République Française.

As young French film critic Guilhem Caillard joined the team in March 2011, CINEMANIA began a collaboration with the Cinémathèque Québécoise, which allows, each year, to welcome a greater number of prestigious guests. This additional location enables the festival to organize retrospectives. According to T'Cha Dunlevy (The Gazette), "Festival director Guilhem has taken Cinemania to unprecedented heights of renown." "We’re answering a deep need in the community, here in Montreal, and in la francophonie, for these films which talk about the world of today differently,” Caillard said. 

Journalist Dunlevy adds: "Not only does Cinemania get local premières of the big movies before they hit theatres — where they’re not always screened with subtitles — but the festival has become a place to catch many independent French-language films that wouldn’t otherwise make it to the big screen here." Renowned actors and actresses, such as Soko and Virginie Efira, attend the event every year.

In 2019, CINEMANIA celebrates its 25th anniversary with brio, recording the highest number of participants in its history with 28 000 spectators and once again reaffirms its commitment to the Francophonie. The French feature films such as Céline Sciamma’s Portrait of A Lady on Fire and Québec’s Sophie Deraspe’s Antigone represent their respective countries in the race for the 2020 Oscars, further enhancing the selection. 

In light of the Covid-19 pandemic, CINEMANIA initiates a major digital shift by developing an online streaming platform for most of its programming. For the first time, viewers from ocean to ocean in Canada are able to watch films from the Festival’s selection from the comfort of their living room. The event runs for three weeks more than 80 virtual screenings, including many highlights of major film fests, from the Festival de Cannes on down. In 2020, and for the first time, CINEMANIA creates an important tribute to a Quebec film director, Louis Bélanger. This famous filmmaker is also the subject of a documentary portrait, produced and directed by CINEMANIA, while Bélanger receives the distinction of Chevalier dans l’Ordre des Arts et des Lettres de la République française from Consul General Frédéric Sanchez. This same year, as the event celebrates its 26th edition, Guilhem Caillard announces that CINEMANIA "opens a new chapter in its history by offering 34 short films, an original selection with an emphasis on creativity and diversity. For the very first time, the Festival is launching a short-film competition with a specialized jury. The Nespresso-AQCC Jury Prize has been created for this purpose. Further, our association with the Saguenay International Short Film Festival, whose 24th edition was abruptly interrupted by the quarantine, is indicative of the strong ties we maintain with our colleagues." As the Organisation Internationale de la Francophonie (OIF) celebrates its 50th anniversary, the film selection takes another step toward a greater Francophonie, vibrant and creative, with new feature films from the Ivory-Coast, Morocco, France, Luxembourg, Rwanda and Belgium.

Program 
CINEMANIA's very specific role in the panorama of Montreal and Quebec's cinematographic events is that it is the only francophone film festival devoted solely to presenting quality French-language feature films subtitled in English. In fact, for many of the films screened, the festival is the only avenue of distribution. CINEMANIA is, as a result, considered by many artists, journalists and cinephiles as a unique portal to view French-language films.

CINEMANIA offers cinephiles the opportunity of discovering a wide range of French-language films: masterpieces, innovative films and first feature films by young directors.

CINEMANIA shows approximately 50 feature films, each film screening twice. In order to arrive at their final selection, the Festival programmers view over 120 French-language films each year. The focus is both on established filmmakers and first-time directors, providing a launching pad for up-and-coming talent. Well-known directors whose work appears frequently on CINEMANIA's screen include André Téchiné, Anne Fontaine, François Ozon, Maïwenn, Robert Guédiguian, Manuel Poirier, Aki Kauresmaki, and the Dardennes Bros. There have been guest appearances by such notable filmmakers as Bertrand Tavernier, Arnaud Desplechin, Olivier Assayas, Cédric Klapisch, Nicole Garcia, Alexandre Arcady, Costa-Gavras, Jean-Jacques Beinix, Patrice Leconte, and Radu Mihaileanu.  CINEMANIA guest stars have included Michel Hazanavicius, Juliette Binoche, Emmanuelle Béart, Isabelle Huppert, Virginie Efira, Lambert Wilson, Laurent Lafitte and Soko, among others.

Public 
CINEMANIA's loyal public keeps growing year after year. After 11 years at the Montreal Museum of Fine Arts, CINEMANIA moved to the Imperial Cinema to increase its capacity and thus respond to cinephiles' ever growing interest in the festival. The 12th edition saw its attendance increase by 50%, and the 13th edition in 2007 continued this growth. Those successive increases did not diminish the "cine-club" atmosphere of the festival, which is characterized by the interaction of film lovers and artists.

In 2020, as CINEMANIA went online due to the Covid-19 pandemic, the box-office resultats were surprisingly very impressive: the event reached out close to 30 000 spectators everywhere in Canada. Managing Director Guilhem Caillard declared: "One thing is certain, the results of this 26th online edition of CINEMANIA have far exceeded all our expectations. We are stunned by the number of viewers who participated in this edition. For the first time, our festival went out to meet viewers in the privacy of their homes, in the four corners of the province of Quebec and far beyond. CINEMANIA now has new fans in the rest of Canada. This is, I believe, what we must remember about the complex situation we are all facing: the health crisis has exacerbated the need for culture, entertainment, the appetite for a different kind of cinema, the need to discover and defend French-language films."

Related activities 
CINEMANIA organizes quality events that challenge and stimulate many cinephiles: master classes, discussion panels, presentation of films by their directors and actors, question and answer sessions after the projections.

Mel Hoppenheim Prix du public 

The Festival awards an annual prize, the Mel Hoppenheim Prix du Public, given each year to the most popular film by public ballot.

Over the years, the Mel Hoppenheim Prix du Public went to the following films:
1998: Serial Lover, directed by James Huth
1999: Girl on the Bridge (La Fille sur le pont), directed by Patrice Leconte
2000: Sentimental Destinies (Les Destinées sentimentales), directed by Olivier Assayas
2001: Once We Grow Up (Quand on sera grand), directed by Renaud Cohen
2002: Yes, But... (Oui, mais...), directed by Yves Lavandier
2003: If I Were a Rich Man (Ah! Si j'étais riche), directed by Michel Munz and Gérard Bitton
2004: Twenty-Five Degrees in Winter (25 degrés en hiver), directed by Stéphane Vuillet
2005: Live and Become (Va, vis et deviens), directed by Radu Mihaileanu
2006: Gorgeous! (Comme t'y es belle !), directed by Lisa Azuelos
2007: The Diving Bell and the Butterfly (Le Scaphandre et le papillon), directed by Julian Schnabel
2008: Versailles, directed by Pierre Schoeller
2009: Le Concert, directed by Radu Mihaileanu
2010: Potiche, directed by François Ozon
2011: Polisse, directed by Maïwenn
2012: Ombline, directed by Stéphane Cazes
2013: Violette, directed by Martin Provost
2014: Diplomacy, directed by Volker Schlöndorff
2015: The Sense of Wonder (Le Goût des merveilles), directed by Eric Besnard
2016: A Kid (Le Fils de Jean), directed by Philippe Lioret
2017: See You Up There (Au revoir là-haut), directed by Albert Dupontel
2018: Sink or Swim (Le grand bain), directed by Gilles Lellouche
2019: Spread Your Wings (Donne-moi des ailes), directed by Nicolas Vanier
2020: Call Me Human (Je m'appelle humain), directed by Kim O'Bomsawin

Audience award for the Best First Feature Film 
CINEMANIA presents, since 2012, an additional award dedicated to encouraging talented newcomers of the francophone cinema world. The public will vote for the 13 first-time feature film screened at the festival.

The TFO Audience award went to the following films:

 2012  : Ombline, directed by Stéphane Cazes
 2013  : Tonnerre, directed by Guillaume Brac
 2014  : Number One Fan (Elle l'adore), directed by Jeanne Henry
 2015  : Journey Through China (Voyage en Chine), directed by Zoltan Mayer
 2016  : The Dancer (La Danseuse), directed by Stéphanie Di Giusto

Prix Visages de la francophonie TV5 
New Award launched in 2017. For the competition, the Programming Committee selects feature films that offer reflections on the Francophone world, its political and social issues and the contemporary history of the countries portrayed. All the titles will be competing for the "Visages de la Francophonie TV5" Award (a cash prize for the winning director for the development of their next project). The films selected are judged by members of the Francophone Youth Jury.

 2017 : Bloody Milk (Petit paysan), directed by Hubert Charuel
 2018 : Sofia, directed by Meryem Benm'Barek
 2019 : Camille, directed by Boris Lojkine
 2020 : Call Me Human (Je m'appelle humain), directed by Kim O'Bomsawin

Award for the Best Quebec film or coproduction 
New Award launched in 2020. With the Quebec film industry experiencing some difficult months in 2020, CINEMANIA wants to extend its solidarity and make a concrete contribution promoting cinema from here. Thus, the festival is particularly pleased and proud to be launching this new award, made possible thanks to the generous support of Michel Trudel, founder of Mel’s Cité du Cinéma and Locations Michel Trudel.

 2020 : Night of the Kings (La nuit des rois), directed by Philippe Lacôte

AQCC-Nespresso Award for Best Short Film 
New Award launched in 2020. The 26 short films were selected with an eye to celebrating diversity and supporting the next generation of filmmakers. Six Francophone countries are represented: Morocco, Belgium, Luxembourg, Senegal, Canada and France. Many of the titles will be making their Canadian premier. The winning filmmaker is selected by a new jury made up of three Quebec film critics and will take home the AQCC-Nespresso Critics Award (a cash prize).

 2020 : Landgraves, directed by Jean-François Leblanc

See also 
List of French films
List of French actors
List of French directors
List of French-language films
Culture of France
Cinema of Quebec

References

External links 
 http://www.festivalcinemania.com

Film festivals in Montreal